Stephanie Sachiko Parker (born September 1, 1956) is an American actress who has film and television credits.

Early life
Parker was born in Los Angeles, California, the only child of actress Shirley MacLaine and businessman Steve Parker (1922–2001). MacLaine and her husband had an open marriage. At age two, Parker was sent  to Japan to live with her father and his mistress. During the summer and at holidays, she visited her mother. They posed together on the cover of the February 9, 1959, issue of Life. Parker said her parents were negligent and her father was verbally abusive, calling her "the idiot" and forbidding her to read. Parker was frequently left home alone while her father went out. As a teen, she was sent to boarding school in Europe. Parker recalled that one Christmas neither of her parents showed up to pick her up from boarding school when she was 14, stranding her in Europe for weeks. Parker intended to go to college but claims she was cut off financially from her parents at 17.

Her maternal uncle is actor Warren Beatty.

Career
Parker taught skiing in New Zealand, worked as a waitress in Hawaii, joined Qantas 24 Apr 1979 and spent five years working as a flight attendant for Qantas Airways, and worked for a brief time as an au pair in Paris, France. In 1981, she returned to Los Angeles, and decided to become an actress. Parker claimed her mother did little to help and sabotaged her career.

Parker's work includes television appearances on Star Trek: The Next Generation, Equal Justice, and Alien Nation, and small film roles in Stick, About Last Night..., Peggy Sue Got Married and Bad Influence. Parker has also done small local theater. Parker starred in the 2009 Japanese film The Witch of the West Is Dead, which showed at the Palm Springs International Film Festival.

On February 7, 2013, the Penguin Group published Parker's autobiography, Lucky Me: My Life With – and Without – My Mom, Shirley MacLaine. Parker opened up about her unconventional childhood and her estranged relationship with her mother. Parker was a lonely child and she still struggles with "abandonment issues and loneliness." Parker said writing the book was therapeutic and though she struggled with guilt, she "decided to stop protecting her." She sent her mother a copy of the book with a note saying, "I love you." MacLaine called the book "virtually all fiction," and added "I'm sorry to see such a dishonest, opportunistic effort from my daughter for whom I've only ever wanted the best."

Personal life
Parker was married to investment banker Frank Murray from 1993 to 2011, and they lived for a time in Houston, Texas, while Murray was the chairman and CEO of Goodman Holdings and Amana Appliances. Parker and Murray have two children, a son, Frank Murray Jr. (born 1996), and a daughter, Arin Murray (born 1998).

Filmography
Stick (1985) – Bobbi
Back to the Future (1985) – Bystander #1
About Last Night... (1986) – Carrie
Peggy Sue Got Married (1986) – Lisa
Riders to the Sea (1987)
Scrooged (1988) – Belle
Vietnam Texas (1990) – Young Woman
Bad Influence (1990) – Michael's Neighbor
Welcome Home, Roxy Carmichael (1990) – Libby Ohiemacher
Nishi no majo ga shinda (2008) – Granny
All Me, All the Time (2009) – Pam
Toiretto (2010) – (final film role)

References

Bibliography
Lucky Me: My Life With – and Without – My Mom, Shirley MacLaine (Penguin Group USA, published February 2013)

External links

1956 births
Living people
Actresses from Los Angeles
American film actresses
American expatriates in Japan
American expatriates in France
American expatriates in New Zealand
American television actresses
21st-century American women